Once Upon a Halloween is a 2005 British animated fantasy film featuring the Evil Queen (from Snow White and the Seven Dwarfs) and Disney Villains. The film is an anthology that features clips from Disney animated films plus shorts and songs. While the scenes shown as flashbacks are from traditional animated films, the original scenes of the film featuring the Evil Queen with her cauldron were animated in CGI.

Plot 
On the night before Halloween, the Evil Queen from Snow White and the Seven Dwarfs plans to conquer Halloween, and asks her cauldron to show you several villains, to which one of them helps her in her plan, such as Peg Leg Pete from Mickey & Friends (in his role as Tiny Tom in Officer Duck), Ursula from The Little Mermaid, Captain Hook from Peter Pan, Yzma from The Emperor's New Groove, Professor Ratigan from The Great Mouse Detective, Alameda Slim from Home on the Range, and Judge Frollo from The Hunchback of Notre Dame. The cauldron also explains its origins and the Horned King, both from The Black Cauldron. At the end however, the cauldron makes the Evil Queen disappear, foiling her plan to take over Halloween.

Cast
Susanne Blakeslee as the Evil Queen
Corey Burton as Cauldron
Pat Carroll as Performer of "Sidekicks and Henchmen"; Ursula (archive voice)
Archive voice cast include:
Grant Bardsley as Taran
Susan Sheridan as Princess Eilonwy
Nigel Hawthorne as Fflewddur Fflam
John Byner as Gurgi
Eda Reiss Merin as Orddu
Adele Malis-Morey as Orwen
Billie Hayes as Orgoch
Clarence Nash as Donald Duck
Billy Bletcher as Tiny Tom (Peg Leg Pete)
Jodi Benson as Ariel
Hans Conried as Captain Hook
Bill Thompson as Mr. Smee
Eartha Kitt as Yzma
Patrick Warburton as Kronk
Vincent Price as Professor Ratigan
Candy Candido as Fidget
Alan Young as Mr. Flaversham
Susanne Pollatschek as Olivia Flaversham
Randy Quaid as Alameda Slim
Sam J. Levine as the Willie Brothers
Tony Jay as Judge Claude Frollo
John Hurt as the Horned King
Phil Fondacaro as Creeper

See also 
Disney Villains
 "Our Unsung Villains" (1956)
 "Disney's Greatest Villains" (1977)
 "Halloween Hall o' Fame" (1977)
 "A Disney Halloween" (1981)
 "Disney's Halloween Treat" (1982)
 "A Disney Halloween" (1983)
 "Scary Tales" (1986, varies)
Mickey's House of Villains (2002)

Notes

External links 
 

Disney direct-to-video animated films
2005 direct-to-video films
British animated films
British films about Halloween
2005 animated films
2005 films
2000s English-language films
2000s American films
2000s British films